Jiří Studík (born 12 September 1986) is a Czech footballer who plays as a defender. He scored his first top-flight league goal in February 2008.

References

External links
 
 

1985 births
Living people
Czech footballers
Czech Republic under-21 international footballers
Czech First League players
SK Slavia Prague players
1. FC Slovácko players
FK Bohemians Prague (Střížkov) players
FK Baník Most players
FK Baník Sokolov players
Association football defenders